Juan Zurita (2 May 1917 – 24 March 2000) was a Mexican professional boxer in the lightweight division and a 1944 National Boxing Association Lightweight world champion. Zurita was a southpaw or left handed boxer, who often fought with his right foot forward, though at times he could lead with his right as well. American newspapers distinguished him as the first native-born Mexican to win a world boxing title.

Early life and career
Zurita was born on May 2, 1917 near Veracruz, Mexico on the Atlantic Coast. He began fighting professionally in early 1932, on the Western Mexican coast in Guadalajara, Jalisco, Mexico.

Taking the Featherweight Championship of Mexico, February 1934
Early in his career, Zurita won the Featherweight Championship of Mexico, defeating Joe Conde on February 24, 1934, in a twelve round points decision for the title. He defeated Joe Conde again in a rematch for the Featherweight Championship on March 11, 1939 in a twelve round points decision at the Arena Mexico in Mexico City.

On January 4, 1935, Zurita defeated Pablo Dano in a ten round points decision at Legion Stadium in Hollywood, California. Zurita took four rounds, Dano three, and three were even. Zurita took the first four rounds according to the Los Angeles Times and finished strong in the final round. The win was significant for Zurita as Dano was the more experienced boxer and favored in the early betting.

On February 15, 1936, Zurita defeated Californian boxer Georgie Hansford in a fifth round knockout in Mexico City.

Bouts with former World Flyweight Champion Midget Wolgast, 1935–36

On March 28, 1936, he defeated American boxer Midget Wolgast at the Arena Nacional in Mexico City in a fifth round knockout. Zurita sent Wolgast to the mat for a count of nine in the fifth, before finishing him shortly after for a full count with a left to the stomach and a right to the chin. On July 24, 1936, Zurita defeated Wolgast again in a ten round points decision at Legion Stadium in Hollywood, California. Zurita forced the fighting through the entire bout and had the cleaner and more effective punches. There were no knockdowns in the bout. The referee gave eight rounds to Zurita, and two to Wolgast, though Braven Dyer of the Los Angeles Times felt the fight was a bit closer. Zurita seemed strongest in the closing rounds. He had lost to Wolgast three times previously in 1935, on February 21, May 21, and June 28 in ten round points decisions, first in Los Angeles and then twice at Legion Stadium in Hollywood. Wolgast had formerly held the World Flyweight Title in July 1931, and had contended unsuccessfully for the World Bantamweight Title.

On August 18, 1936, Zurita lost to exceptional Black boxer Henry Armstrong in a fourth round knockout at Olympic Stadium in Los Angeles.  At the time, Armstrong held the California version of the World Featherweight Title. Zurita probably carried the first two round on points with a furious attack. In the bottom of the third, Armstrong had found his range and made a number of effective blows to the head of Zurita that had him groggy. In his career, Armstrong would also hold the World Welterweight Championship. Zurita lost again to Armstrong on October 13, 1942, in a second round knockout at Olympic Auditorium in Los Angeles. The final blow was a right to the chin 2:20 into the second. The final blow was a left hook followed by a right cross, 2:20 into the second, and was the only knockdown in the bout. By their last bout in October 1942, Armstrong had taken world titles in both the Welterweight and Lightweight divisions.

On January 1, 1937, Zurita defeated Spanish boxer Baltasar Sangchili in a ten round points decision in Mexico City. In June 1935, Sangchili had taken the IBU World Bantamweight Title in Valencia, Spain, and had taken the World Bantamweight Championship in the same year.

Zurita defeated New York based Puerto-Rican born Koli Kolo around June 1, 1938, in a fourth round knockout in Tepic, Nayarit, Mexico. The exact date of the bout remains unknown, and may have occurred the month earlier.

On June 18, 1938, Zurita defeated talented Mexican boxer Rodolfo "Baby" Casanova in Guadalajara, Jalisco, Mexico in a sixth round Technical Knockout. It was Zurita's only win against Casanova. On August 20, 1938, Zurita would lose to Casonova in a sixth round technical knockout in Mexico City. In four earlier meetings with Casanova, in a Mexican Featherweight Title match on September 15, 1934, and in matches in April 1935, April 1936, and June 1937, Zurita would lose. Though each boxer was close in height and very close in reach, Zurita did not seem to match up well with Casanova who was two years older and may have benefited from two extra years in age. By September 1934, Casanova had taken the Mexican Featherweight Championship, and had scored seven successful defenses of the title.

Mid-career as a professional

Taking the Mexican Lightweight Title, September 1938
Zurita first took the Mexican Lightweight Title on September 10, 1938 against Joe Conde in a twelve round points decision at the Arena in Mexico City, though few if any American newspapers covered the story.

On May 15, 1939 Zurita first defeated Jimmy Hatcher in a ten round decision at the Walkathon Theater in San Antonio, Texas. He defeated Hatcher again on September 11, 1942, in a second round technical knockout at Legion Stadium in Hollywood. The bout was stopped by the referee thirty seconds into the second round after Hatcher received a long cut on his forehead. The loss ended Hatcher's string of nineteen straight wins.<ref>"Juan Zurita Stops Hatcher in Second", The Fresno Bee", Fresno, California, pg. 8, 12 September 1942</ref>

On July 21, 1940, Zurita defeated Speedy Dado in a fifth round technical knockout at the Arena Progreso at Jalisco, Mexico. Dado was a talented Philippines-born boxer who would take the USA California State Bantamweight Title in October 1933, and later compete unsuccessfully for the World Bantamweight Title in May 1935.

On May 17, 1941, Zurita defeated Carlos Miranda in a third round knockout in Mexico City.

On November 14, 1941, Zurita defeated George Latka in a ten round points decision at Legion Stadium in Hollywood, California. Twice in the second and once in the tenth Zurita scored against Latka with strong blows. Zurita started on the aggressive, and though the middle rounds were close, Zurita probably always led in points."Zurita Gets Decision Over Latka", The Salt Lake Tribune, Salt Lake City, Utah, pg. 30, 16 November 1941

On July 24, 1942, Zurita defeated Richie Lemos at Hollywood's Legion Stadium in a ten round points decision. Lemos went to his corner groggy at the end of the third and fifth rounds, and may have taken eight rounds. Paul Lowry of the Los Angeles Times'' gave Zurita every round. Zurita skillfully evaded the blows of Lemos with cunning, and landed left hooks to the body and rights and lefts to the head of Lemos throughout the bout.

On August 19, 1942, Zurita defeated Black boxer Henry Woods in a ten round points decision at the Auditorium in Oakland, California.  Woods was down for a nine count in the third round from a powerful left to the body by Zurita. Ringsiders gave Zurita seven of the ten rounds. Woods held his own in the fourth and fifth, but Zurita finished strong in the final rounds.

Taking the NBA World Lightweight Title, March 8, 1944

Zurita won the NBA World Lightweight Title on March 8, 1944, against Sammy Angott in a fifteen round unanimous decision at Gilmore Field, the Hollywood Ball Park, in Los Angeles, California. Zurita became the first Mexican to win the World Lightweight Championship in a bit of an upset victory that saw Angott as a 4 to 1 favorite. It was Angott's first loss in the lightweight class. Zurita skillfully blocked Angott's left hooks and uppercuts and scored with counter punches to the body, though Angott appeared tired and haggard from having to make the lightweight limit. Angott won only the first round when Zurita appeared puzzled by his style, but the remaining fourteen rounds went to Zurita by a comfortable and decisive margin. The crowd of 11,300 was not pleased by what they viewed as a somewhat lackluster performance, though Zurita held his edge throughout the bout. Angott, perhaps as a result of his fatigue, was off on his timing, and had trouble landing solid punches. Angott's future in the ring was questionable after the loss.

Loss in non-title bout with Beau Jack, March 31, 1944
Immediately after taking the World Lightweight Title, Zurita lost to the great American Black boxer Beau Jack on March 31, 1944, at New York's Madison Square Garden in a ten round points decision. The great promoter Mike Jacobs signed Zurita to the bout, which must have been a financial success.  Zurita faded after the fifth round, and was given only three rounds to seven for Jack by the United Press. The Mexican champion looked strong in the tenth, and took the round. There was a capacity crowd of 17,593 fans to watch the bout who were hoping for more action in the early rounds. Jack, a popular favorite, held the NYSAC Lightweight Championship at the time of the bout, which may have accounted for the size of the crowd.

Win over Pete Lello after seven month break from boxing, October 1944
On October 6, 1944, Zurita defeated Pete Lello in a second round knockout at the Arena Coliseo in Mexico City. Atypically the blow that ended the fight was a terrific uppercut to the body of Lello in the opening seconds of the second round. A crowd of 20,000 saw the bout in the bullring. The bout was Zurita's first after a seven month layoff from boxing to recover from accidentally shooting himself in the hand around June.

On October 18, 1944, Zurita knocked out Aldo Spoldi, European Lightweight Champion, in the fourth round at Municipal Auditorium in San Antonio, Texas. In the main event before a crowd of 5000, a hard right to the face put Spoldi down for a count of nine. After arising, Zurita put Spoldi down for the full count.

Losing the NBA Lightweight World Championship against Ike Williams, April 1945
Zurita lost the NBA World Lightweight Championship before a crowd of 35,000 by a second round knockout from Black New Jersey boxer Ike Williams in Mexico City on April 18, 1945. Their first planned meeting in Philadelphia had to be cancelled by the Pennsylvania Boxing Commission who recognized Bob Montgomery as the lightweight champion. Williams made a two fisted attack to the head of Zurita in the second which Zurita could not hold off, though he had made an effective defense in the first round. It was Zurita's first title defense. Shortly after Zurita was counted out, Williams' corner was crowded by fans, and several policeman were required to clear the ring before Williams could return to his dressing room.

Zurita defeated Mike Belloise on January 31, 1945, in a third round technical decision, when Belloise failed to come out at the opening of the fourth round. Zurita had floored the former World Featherweight Champion at the end of the third round with a right to the mid-section, but the bell sounded before a count could be completed.

Zurita died on Thursday, March 23, 2000 in Mexico City after being in a coma for several days. He was 82.

Zurita was inducted into the World Boxing Hall of Fame in 1997.

Professional boxing record

See also
List of Mexican boxing world champions
List of lightweight boxing champions

References

External links
 
 Juan Zurita Bio at Boxrec
 Beau Jack and Juan Zurita 25 March 1944 At Stillman's Gym, New York City - Photograph

1917 births
2000 deaths
Boxers from Jalisco
Mexican male boxers
World lightweight boxing champions
Lightweight boxers